KFER (89.9 FM) is a radio station broadcasting a Religious format. Licensed to Santa Cruz, California, United States, it serves the Santa Cruz area.  The station is currently owned by Santa Cruz Educational Broadcasting Foundation. It goes under the branding of Aware FM.

External links

Moody Radio affiliate stations
Santa Cruz, California
FER